Kupyansky Uyezd was one of the subdivisions of the Kharkiv Governorate of the Russian Empire. It was situated in the southeastern part of the governorate. Its administrative centre was Kupiansk (Kupyansk).

Demographics
At the time of the Russian Empire Census of 1897, Kupyansky Uyezd had a population of 234,182. Of these, 86.6% spoke Ukrainian, 13.2% Russian and 0.1% Polish as their native language.

References

 
Uezds of Kharkov Governorate
Kharkov Governorate